Karim Touzani (born 11 September 1980) is a Dutch former footballer of Moroccan descent. He played as a midfielder or a defender. He is also the older brother of football freestyler, Soufiane Touzani.

Club career
Born in Amsterdam, Touzani came through the Ajax academy, but failed to make the first team. He then went on to play for FC Utrecht and FC Twente, an identical history to former Aberdeen and Scotland striker Scott Booth. While playing for Utrecht, he was just about to make a £1.5 million move to PSV Eindhoven, until an unfortunate training ground injury. He suffered a cracked tibia and fibula, after an ill-timed lunge tackle by Dirk Kuyt.

He signed a one-year deal with Aberdeen in June 2006 but was plagued by injury throughout his first season in Scotland. In July 2008, Touzani completed a free transfer to Dutch outfit Sparta Rotterdam. Touzani's contract was not renewed for the 2011–12 season, this implicated the end of his professional football career.

International career
He played for the Netherlands youth team, alongside Rafael van der Vaart.

References

External links

1980 births
Living people
Footballers from Amsterdam
Dutch sportspeople of Moroccan descent
Association football midfielders
Association football defenders
Dutch footballers
FC Utrecht players
FC Twente players
Aberdeen F.C. players
Sparta Rotterdam players
Eredivisie players
Scottish Premier League players
Expatriate footballers in Scotland
Dutch expatriate footballers